The 2018 season was St. Patrick's Athletic F.C.'s 89th year in existence and was the Supersaints' 67th consecutive season in the top flight of Irish football. It was the seventh year that Liam Buckley is the team's manager (in his current spell), following replacing Pete Mahon in December 2011. Buckley resigned from his post as manager on 25 September with assistant Ger O'Brien taking over for the remainder of the season. It was the first year of the new format of the League of Ireland Premier Division where by there will be 10 teams playing each other four times, twice home and twice away. On 19 December 2017 the fixtures were announced with Pat's down to play champions Cork City on the opening day of the season on 16 February 2018.

Squad

Transfers

Pre-season

In

Out

Mid-season

In

Out

Squad statistics

Appearances, goals and cards
Number in brackets represents (appearances of which were substituted ON).
Last updated – 28 October 2018

Top scorers
Includes all competitive matches.
Last updated 28 October 2018

Top assists
Includes all competitive matches.
Last updated 28 October 2018

Top clean sheets
Includes all competitive matches.
Last updated 28 October 2018

Disciplinary record

Captains

Club

Coaching Staff
Manager: Liam Buckley
Head Of Player Recruitment/Coach: Dave Campbell
Assistant coach/Director of Football: Ger O'Brien
Coach: Martin Doyle
Goalkeeping coach: Pat Jennings
Chartered Physiotherapist/Strength and Conditioning Coach: Mark Kenneally
Coaches Assistant: Graeme Buckley
Physiotherapist: Christy O'Neill
Club Doctor: Dr Matt Corcoran
Kit Man: Derek Haines
Equipment Manager: David McGill
Under 19's Manager: Darius Kierans
Under 19's Assistant Manager: Simon Madden
Under 17's Manager: Jamie Moore
Under 17's Assistant Manager: Darragh O'Reilly
Under 17's Assistant Manager: Sean Gahan
Under 15's Manager: Denis Hyland
Under 15's Assistant Manager: Sean O'Connor
Under 15's Coach: Paul Webb
Under 19's/17's/15's Coach: Keith Andrews
Under 19's/17's Goalkeeping Coach: Stephen O'Reilly

Kit

|
|
|
|}

The club released a new home kit for the season, with the away kit being retained from the 2017 season. During the season, a new limited edition third kit was released for the friendly game with Newcastle United.

Competitions

League of Ireland

League table

Results summary

Results by round

Matches

FAI Cup

EA Sports Cup

Leinster Senior Cup

Friendlies

Pre-season

Mid-season

References

2018
2018 League of Ireland Premier Division by club